The Men's sprint at the European Track Championships was first competed in 2010 in Poland, and has been held in each championships since. With three gold medals and a bronze from four championships, the event has been dominated by Russia's Denis Dmitriev.

The Sprint consists of a qualifying, followed by a knockout system until the final. From the quarterfinals on two wins are needed to advance.

Medalists

References

2010 Results
2011 Results
2012 Results
2013 Results

 
Men's sprint
Men's sprint (track cycling)